Hostplus is an industry superannuation fund for the hospitality, tourism, recreation and sport industries in Australia established in 1987.

It has more than one million members and $50 billion in funds under management, making it one of the largest superannuation funds in Australia.

The Hostplus indexed balanced fund is one of the recommended fund options in Scott Pape's Barefoot Investor. Canstar in 2021 rated Hostplus a 5 star super fund, with this 2nd highest return on investment over 8 years of 8.8%, and the highest for the previous 12 months of 23.2%.  

In 2022, Statewide Super merged with HostPlus.

References

External links
Hostplus website

Australian companies established in 1987
Financial services companies established in 1987
Superannuation funds in Australia